Gérard is a French masculine given name and surname of Germanic origin, variations of which exist in many Germanic and Romance languages. Like many other early Germanic names, it is dithematic, consisting of two meaningful constituents put together. In this case, those constituents are gari > ger- (meaning 'spear') and -hard (meaning 'hard/strong/brave'). The English cognate of Gérard is Gerard.

As a given name

 Gérard Adanhoumé (born 1986), Beninese footballer
 Gérard Araud (born 1953), Permanent Representative of France to the United Nations
 Gérard Asselin (born 1950), Canadian politician
 Gérard Audran (1640-1703), French engraver
 Gérard Bailly (born 1940), French politician
 Gérard Balanche (born 1968), Swiss ski jumper and Olympian
 Gérard Banide (born 1936), French football coach
 Gérard Bapt (born 1946), French politician
 Gérard Barray (born 1931), French film and television actor
 Gérard Barreaux (1948-2010), French accordionist, composer and actor
 Gerard Béhague (1937-2005), French-born American ethnomusicologist and professor of Latin American music
 Gérard Bélanger (born 1940), Canadian economist and educator 
 Gérard Berliner (1956–2010), French actor and composer
 Gérard Berry (born 1948), French computer scientist 
 Gérard Bessette (1920–2005), Canadian author and educator
 Gérard Bessière (born 1928), French author and priest
 Gérard Biguet (born 1946), French football referee 
 Gérard Binet (born 1955), Canadian politician
 Gérard Bitsindou (1941–2012), Republic of the Congo politician and judge
 Gérard Blain (1930-2000), French actor and film director
 Gérard Blanc (1947– 2009), French pop singer and guitarist
 Gérard Blitz (1912–1990), Belgian water polo player, Yogi and entrepreneur
 Gérard Blitz (1901–1979), Belgian Olympic swimmer and water polo player 
 Gérard Bonnevie (born 1952), French alpine skier and Olympian
 Gérard Bouchard (born 1943), Canadian historian, sociologist and writer
 Gérard Bougrier (born 1944), French civil servant
 Gérard Boulanger (born 1948), French politician, lawyer and human rights activist 
 Gérard Brach (1927–2006), French screenwriter 
 Gérard Brachet (born 1944) French aerospace engineer
 Gérard Brosselin (1870–1905), French tennis player
 Gérard Bruchési (born 1931), Canadian politician and insurance broker
 Gérard Buquet (born 1954), French conductor and composer
 Gérard Buscher (born 1960), French football player and manager 
 Gérard Calvet (1927–2008), French Roman Catholic abbot
 Gérard Calvi (born 1922), French composer
 Gérard d'Aboville (born 1945) French rower, first man to row across two oceans solo
 Gérard Thibault d'Anvers (c.1574–1627), Dutch fencing master and author 
 Gérard de Balorre (1899–1974), French equestrian and Olympian
 Gérard of Brogne (c.895–959), Belgian Roman Catholic abbot
 Gérard Le Cam (born 1954), French politician
 Gérard Caron (1916-1986), Canadian organist and pianist
 Gérard Caron (born 1938), French advertiser and designer 
 Gérard Caussé (born 1948), French violist
 Gérard Cauvin (????-1531), French father of the Protestant Reformer John Calvin
 Gérard César (December 1934), French politician
 Gérard Chaliand (born 1934), French expert in armed-conflict studies and international and strategic relations
 Gérard Chapdelaine (born 1935), Canadian politician and lawyer
 Gérard Charasse (born 1944), French politician 
 Gérard Cherpion (born 1948), French politician 
 Gérard Cholley (born 1945), French international rugby union player 
 Gérard Cochet (1888–1969), French illustrator
 Gérard Collomb (born 1947), French politician, Mayor of Lyon
 Gérard Cooreman (1852–1926), Belgian politician
 Gérard Corbiau (born 1941), Belgian film director
 Gérard de Cortanze (born 1948,) French writer, essayist, translator and literary critic
 Gérard Coste (born 1939), French painter and diplomat
 Gérard Côté (1913–1993), Canadian marathon runner 
 Gérard de Courcelles (????-1927), French racing driver 
 Gérard Cournoyer (1912–1973), Canadian politician and lawyer 
 Gérard Crombac (1929–2005), Swiss auto-racing journalist
 Gérard Dagon (1936-2011), French evangelical Protestant pastor, teacher, author, publisher anti-cult activist
 Gérard Darmon (born 1948), French actor and singer
 Gérard Darrieu (1925–2004), French actor
 Gérard Daucourt (born 1941), Swiss Catholic Bishop
 Gérard Debreu (1921–2004), French economist and mathematician
 Gérard Delbeke (1903-1977), Belgian footballer 
 Gérard Deltell (born 1964), Canadian politician
 Gérard Depardieu (born 1948), French-born Russian actor and film-maker
 Gérard Deprez (born 1943), Belgian politician
 Gérard Dériot (born 1944), French politician 
 Gérard Desargues (1591-1661), French mathematician and engineer 
 Gérard Deschamps (born 1937), French contemporary artist
 Gérard Paul Deshayes (1795– 1875), French geologist and conchologist
 Gérard Desrosiers (born 1919), Canadian physician and founder of the first regional library in Quebec
 Gérard Devos (1903-1972), Belgian footballer
 Gérard Diffloth (born 1939), French linguist
 Gérard Dionne (born 1919), Canadian Roman Catholic Bishop
 Gérard Ducarouge (born 1941), French Formula One race car designer
 Gérard Dufresne (born 1918), Canadian politician and a military officer 
 Gérard Duquet (1909-1986), Canadian politician
 Gérard Edelinck (1640–1707), Flemish-born French copper-plate engraver and print publisher 
 Gérard Encausse (1865-1916), Spanish-born French physician, hypnotist, popularizer of occultism, founder of the modern Martinist Order
 Gérard Errera (born 1943), French diplomat
 Gérard Farison (born 1944), French footballer
 Gérard Feldzer (born 1944), French aviator and consultant and aerospace engineer
 Gérard Fenouil (born 1945), French track and field athlete and Olympian
 Gérard Férey (born 1941), French chemist and teacher
 Gérard Filion (1909–2005), Canadian businessman and journalist
 Gérard Fombrun (born 1931), Haitian sculptor
 Gérard La Forest (born 1926), Canadian former member of the Supreme Court of Canada and lawyer  
 Gérard Fromanger (1939–2021), French artist 
 Gérard Fussman (born 1940) French indologist
 Gérard Gagnon (fl. 1970s), Canadian priest and translator
 Gérard Garitte (1914–1992), Belgian scientist and historian 
 Gérard Garouste (born 1946), French painter, illustrator, and decorator
 Gérard Gasiorowski (1930—1986), French photographer, painter, and fictive artist
 Gérard Gaudron (born 1949), French politician
 Gérard Gauthier (born 1948), Canadian hockey player
 Gérard Geisbusch (born 1988), Luxembourger footballer
 Gérard Genette (born 1930), French literary theorist
 Gérard Gili (born 1952), French football manager
 Gérard Girouard (born 1933), Canadian politician 
 Gérard Gnanhouan (born 1979), Ivorian footballer  
 Gérard Granel (1930– 2000), French philosopher and translator 
 Gérard Grenier (????-c. 1165 and 1171), French Christian Crusader 
 Gérard Grisey (1946–1998), French composer
 Gérard Gropaiz (1943–2012), French swimmer and Olympian
 Gérard Guillaumaud (1961–2006), French Air Force test pilot
 Gérard Hallet (born 1946), French footballer
 Gérard Hamel (born 1945), French politician 
 Gérard Hausser (born 1939), French footballer
 Gérard Hekking (1879—1942), French cellist
 Gérard Hernandez (born 1933), Spanish-born French film, television and voice actor
 Gérard Hérold (1935–1993), French actor
 Gérard Hoarau (1950–1985), Seychellois politician
 Gérard Holtz (born 1946), French sports journalist 
 Gérard Houllier (born 1947), French football manager
 Gérard Huet (born 1947), French computer scientist
 Gérard Jaffrès (born 1956), French singer, writer and performer
 Gérard Janvion (born 1953), French footballer
 Gérard Jarry (1936–2004), French violinist
 Gérard Jean-Juste (1946–2009), Haitian Roman Catholic priest and rector
 Gérard Joseph (born 1949), Haitian footballer
 Gérard Jugnot (born 1951), French actor, film director, screenwriter and producer
 Gérard Klein (born 1937), French science fiction writer 
 Gérard Kobéané (born 1988), Burkinabe sprinter and Olympian
 Gérard Krawczyk (born 1953), French film director 
 Gérard Labrune (born 1943), French syndicalist
 Gérard de Lally-Tollendal (1751–1830), French politician
 Gérard Lamy (born 1919), Canadian politician
 Gérard Landry (1914–1989), Argentine actor
 Gérard Lanvin (born 1950), French actor
 Gérard Laprise (1925–2000), Canadian politician
 Gérard Larcher (born 1949), French politician 
 Gérard Larrousse (born 1940), French sports car racing, rallying and Formula One driver
 Gérard Latortue (born 1934), former Haitian Prime Minister
 Gérard Laumon (born 1952), French mathematician
 Gérard Mentor Laurent (1933-2001), Haitian historian and educator
 Gérard Lauzier (1932–2008), French comics author and film director
 Gérard Lebel (born 1930), Canadian politician 
 Gérard Lebovici (1932–1984), French film producer and editor
 Gérard Lefranc (born 1935), French fencer and Olympian 
 Gérard Légaré (1908–1997), Canadian politician
 Gérard Lelièvre (born 1949), French race walker and Olympian
 Gérard Leman (1851–1920), Belgian military general
 Gérard Lenorman (born 1945), French singer
 Gérard Lesne (born 1956), French opera countertenor
 Gérard D. Levesque (1926–1993), Canadian politician 
 Gérard Lifondja (born 1989), Belgian footballer
 Gérard Loiselle (born 1921-1994), Canadian politician
 Gérard Loncke (1905-1979), Belgian professional road bicycle racer 
 Gérard Longuet (born 1946), French politician, former French Minister of Defense
 Gérard Lorgeoux (born 1943), French politician
 Gérard, Duke of Lorraine (c. 1030–1070), French Duke of Alsace
 Gérard Magnin (born 1951), French ecologist
 Gérard Majax (1943), French illusionist 
 Gérard Manset (born 1945), French singer-songwriter, painter, photographer and writer
 Gérard de la Martinière (born 1943), French businessman
 Gérard Masson (born 1936), French composer
 Gérard Mendel (1930–2004), French psychoanalyst and psychiatrist
 Gérard Mestrallet (born 1949), French aerospace engineer, businessman 
 Gérard Millet (born 1939), French politician
 Gérard Miquel (born 1946), French politician
 Gérard Mourou (born 1944), French physicist and engineer
 Gérard Mulliez (born 1931), French businessman and entrepreneur
 Gérard de Nerval (1808–1855), French poet, essayist and translator 
 Gérard Niding (????-????), Canadian politician 
 Gérard Onesta (born 1960), French politician 
 Gérard Kango Ouédraogo (born 1925), Burkinabé politician
 Gérard Ouellet (1913–1975), Canadian politician 
 Gérard Oury (1919– 2006), French film director, actor and screenwriter 
 Gérard Pape (born 1955) American composer, author and psychologist
 Gérard Patris (1931−1990), French film and television director
 Gérard Pierre-Charles (1935–2004), Haitian politician 
 Gérard Pelletier (1919–1997), Canadian journalist and politician
 Gérard Perrier (born 1928), French cross country skier and Olympian 
 Gérard Perron (1920–1981), Canadian politician
 Gérard Philipe (1922–1959), French actor
 Gérard Pirès (born 1942), French film director and screenwriter
 Gérard Prunier (born 1942), French academic and historian
 Gérard du Puy (????-1389), French cardinal of the Roman Catholic Church
 Gérard Rabinovitch (born 1948), French philosopher and sociologist
 Gérard Rancinan (born 1953), French photographer 
 Gérard Rinaldi (1943-2012), French singer and actor 
 Gérard Roland (born 1954), Belgian economist
 Gérard Roland (born 1981), French footballer 
 Gérard Roussel (1500–1550) French cleric and theologian
 Gérard Rousset (1921–2000), French fencer and Olympian 
 Gérard Rozenknop (born 1950) French public servant and aerospace engineer
 Gérard Rudolf (born 1966), South African actor
 Gérard Saint (1935—1960), French professional road bicycle racer
 Gérard Schivardi (born 1950), French politician
 Gérard Ernest Schneider (1896–1986), Swiss painter
 Gérard de Sède (1921-2004), French author and supporter of the Action française political movement
 Gérard Séty (1922–1998), French actor
 Gérard Soisson (1935–1983), Luxembourger  banker
 Gérard Soler (born 1954), French footballer and coach
 Gérard Solvès (born 1968), French tennis player and coach
 Gérard Souzay (1918–2004), French baritone opera singer 
 Gérard Théberge (1930-2000), Canadian ice hockey player and Olympian
 Gérard Théodore (1920–2012), French military officer and statistician
 Gérard Charles Édouard Thériault (1932–1998), Canadian Air Force General and Chief of the Defence Staff  
 Gérard Tremblay (born 1918), Canadian bishop of the Roman Catholic Church
 Gérard Tremblay (born 1950), French race car driver
 Gérard Vachonfrance (1933–2008), French physician
 Gérard de Vaucouleurs (1918–1995), French astronomer
 Gérard Veilleux (born 1942), Canadian businessman, former president of the Canadian Broadcasting Corporation 
 Gérard Vergnaud (1933–2021), French mathematician, philosopher, educator and psychologist
 Gérard de Villiers (born 1929), French writer, journalist and editor
 Gérard Voisin (born 1945), French politician
 Gérard Wertheimer (b. 1950), French businessman, entrepreneur, racehorse breeder and perfumer 
 Gérard Aristote Zaonarivelo (????-????) Malagasy politician

As a surname

 Adolphe Gérard (1844–1900), French chef
 André Gérard (1911–1994, French footballer and football manager. 
 Arnaud Gérard (born 1984), French professional road bicycle racer 
 Balthasar Gérard (c.1557– 1584), French assassin of the Dutch independence leader William I of Orange
 Bernard Gérard (1930-2000), French composer
 Bernard Gérard (born 1953), French politician 
 Charles Gérard (born 1926), French actor
 Christopher Gérard (born 1962), Belgian writer and critic
 Danyel Gérard (born 1939), French pop singer and composer
 David Gérard (born 1977), French rugby union player
 Étienne Maurice Gérard (1773–1852), French Napoleonic military officer and statesman
 François Gérard (1770–1837), French painter 
 Jacques Gérard (1890-1918), French pilot and World War I flying ace
 Jean-Claude Gérard (born 1944), French flautist
 Joseph Gérard (1831-1914), French Catholic missionary
Lucy Gérard (1872-1941), French actress
 Marguerite Gérard (1761–1837), French painter and etcher
 Raphaël Gérard (born 1968), French politician
 Rosemonde Gérard (1871–1953), French poet and playwright
 Yves Gérard (born 1932), French musicologist

See also
 Gayrard
 Gerald
 Gerard
 Gerhard
 Gerhardt
 Gerhart (disambiguation)
 Gerrard (disambiguation)
 Girard (disambiguation)
 Guerard (disambiguation)

French masculine given names
French-language surnames